The Last Word (also titled Cosa Nostra: The Last Word) is a 1995 American crime thriller drama film written and directed by Tony Spiridakis and starring Timothy Hutton, Joe Pantoliano, Michelle Burke, Chazz Palminteri and Tony Goldwyn.  Avi Lerner served as an executive producer of the film.

Cast
Timothy Hutton as Martin Ryan
Joe Pantoliano as Doc
Michelle Burke as Sara
Chazz Palminteri as Ricky
Tony Goldwyn as Stan
Cybill Shepherd as Kiki Taylor
Richard Dreyfuss as Larry

Production
The film was shot in Detroit and Los Angeles.

Release
The film premiered on Showtime on August 27, 1995.

Reception
John Ferguson of Radio Times awarded the film two stars out of five.

Alan Rich of Variety gave the film a negative review and wrote, "For all the surface glitz, there isn’t much in the prevailing deadpan performances — which include cameos by Shepherd and the ubiquitous Richard Dreyfuss — to make anyone care."

References

External links
 
 

1990s English-language films